The World Organization of the Scout Movement (WOSM ) is the largest international Scouting organization. WOSM has 173 members. These members are recognized national Scout organizations, which collectively have around 43 million participants. WOSM was established in 1922, and has its operational headquarters at Kuala Lumpur, Malaysia and its legal seat in Geneva, Switzerland. It is the counterpart of the World Association of Girl Guides and Girl Scouts (WAGGGS).

The WOSM's current stated mission is "to contribute to the education of young people, through a value system based on the Scout Promise and Scout Law, to help build a better world where people are self-fulfilled as individuals and play a constructive role in society". WOSM is organized into regions and operates with a conference, committee and bureau.

The WOSM is associated with three World Scout Centres. The World Scout Jamboree is held roughly every four years under the auspices of the WOSM, with members of WAGGGS also invited. WOSM also organises the World Scout Moot, a Jamboree for 17- to 26-year-olds, and has organised the World Scout Indaba, a gathering for Scout leaders. The World Scout Foundation is a perpetual fund governed by a separate Board of Governors and supported by donations for the development of WOSM associated Scouting programs throughout the world.

WOSM is a non-governmental organization with General Consultative Status to the United Nations Economic and Social Council (ECOSOC).

History
As a result of an international conference held during the first World Scout Jamboree at Olympia, London in 1920, leaders there agreed to create a Boy Scouts International Bureau (BSIB). An office was established at 25, Buckingham Palace Road, London, and the then International Commissioner of The Boy Scouts Association of the United Kingdom, Hubert S. Martin, was appointed as Honorary Director. The first task of the bureau was to co-ordinate the discussions and to prepare a second international conference in Paris in 1922.  At the 1922 Paris conference The International Conference of the Boy Scout Movement, its committee and BSIB were constituted by the founding member organizations. In 1961 The International Conference of the Boy Scout Movement reconstituted the organization introducing the name World Organization of the Scout Movement (WOSM). The International Conference of the Boy Scout Movement became the WOSM's World Scout Conference, its International Committee became the World Scout Committee and the Boy Scouts International Bureau became the WOSM's World Scout Bureau.

World Scout Conference
The World Scout Conference is the governing body and meets every three years, preceded by the World Scout Youth Forum. The World Scout Conference is the general assembly of the World Organization of the Scout Movement and is composed of six delegates from each of the member Scout associations. If a country has more than one association, the associations form a federation for coordination and world representation. The basis for recognition and membership in the World Scout Conference includes adherence to the aims and principles of the World Organization of the Scout Movement, and independence from political involvement on the part of each member association.

The Conference meets every three years and is hosted by a member association. At the World Scout Conference, basic cooperative efforts are agreed upon and a plan of mutual coordination is adopted.

World Scout Committee

The World Scout Committee is the executive body of the World Organization of the Scout Movement and is composed of elected volunteers and one appointed Secretary General. The World Scout Committee represents World Scout Conference between the meetings of the full conference. The World Scout Committee is responsible for the implementation of the resolutions of the World Scout Conference and for acting on its behalf between its meetings. The Committee meets at least twice a year. Its Steering Committee, consisting of the Chairperson, two Vice-Chairpersons, a Youth Advisor and the Secretary General, meet as needed.

The committee has 21 members. Twelve, each from a different country, are elected for three-year terms by the World Scout Conference. The members, elected without regard to their nationality, represent the interests of the movement as a whole, not those of their country. The Secretary General, the Treasurer of WOSM and a representative member of the board of the World Scout Foundation and the chairpersons of the regional Scout committees are ex-officio members of the committee. The six Youth Advisors to the WSC are elected by the World Scout Youth Forum. The Youth Advisors participate in all of the WSC meetings and are also part of the governing structure between the meetings.

The 2021-2024 World Scout Committee has set up work streams to address the top strategic priorities, as defined by the World Scout Conference, which at present include:
 Educational Methods
 Boosting Volunteers (Adults in Scouting Project)
 Earth Tribe Coordinating Team
 Gender Mainstreaming Coordination
 Life Skills Initiative
 SCENES Coordination Team
World Events
Evolution of the World Scout Conference
Innovation of all World Events
Good Governance
Growth, Recovery and Resilience - Enabling Capacities for Growth
GSAT Review and New Partner On-boarding
Safe from Harm 1 - Compliance Mechanism Build, Pilot and Implementation
Safe from Harm in World and Regional Events
Strengthening Consultants Support in Financial Management
WOSM Consultants 2.0

Task forces include:

 Youth Engagement in Decision-Making
 Sustainability

Workstream Coordination Group

 Project management support 
 Volunteer management support 
 Monitoring and evaluation support

Standing committees include:
 Audit
 Budget
 Constitutions
 Ethics
 Honours and Awards
 Steering

Current members 2021–2024

  Note: The World Scout Conference in 2008 decided that, starting at the World Conference in 2011, elected members will serve for only three years, but be eligible for re-election for one additional term. Due SARS-COV2 (COVID-19) pandemic, the World Scout Conference was rescheduled from Aug 2020 to Aug 2021.

Bronze Wolf Award
The Bronze Wolf Award is the only distinction awarded by WOSM, awarded by the World Scout Committee for exceptional services to world Scouting. It was first awarded to Robert Baden-Powell, 1st Baron Baden-Powell by a unanimous decision of the then-International Committee on the day of the institution of the Bronze Wolf in Stockholm in 1935.

World Scout Bureau

The World Scout Bureau (WSB, formerly the International Bureau) is the secretariat that carries out the instructions of the World Scout Conference and the World Scout Committee. The WSB is administered by the secretary general, who is supported by a staff of technical resource personnel. The bureau staff helps associations improve and broaden their Scouting by training professionals and volunteers, establishing finance policies and money-raising techniques, improving community facilities and procedures, and assisting in marshaling the national resources of each country behind Scouting.

The staff also helps arrange global events such as the World Scout Jamborees, encourages regional events, and acts as a liaison between the Scouting Movement and other international organizations. A major effort in the emerging nations is the extension of the universal Good Turn into an organization-wide effort for community development.

Location
The Bureau was first established in London, England in 1920 and moved to Ottawa, Ontario, Canada in 1959. The International Conference directed the move of the Bureau from Ottawa to Geneva on 1 May 1968. In August 2013, WOSM announced the relocation of the World Scout Bureau Central Office (WSB-CO) to Kuala Lumpur where it is now located.

Leadership 
This list includes Secretaries General and their deputies from the World Organization of the Scout Movement and members of the World Scout Bureau. From 1920 to 1968, this function was called Director.

World Scout Centres

World Scout Centre is a brand of the WOSM but the two World Scout Centres are operated by regional divisions of WOSM and an independent body:
 Kandersteg International Scout Centre in Switzerland, operated by the Scouts International Home association.
 Cairo International Scout Centre in Egypt, operated by the Arab Region.

World Scout programmes
The Better World Framework combines the Scouts of the World Award, Messengers of Peace and World Scout Environment Programmes as programme initiatives administered by the World Scout Bureau.

World Scout emblem

The WOSM emblem and membership badge is the World Scout Emblem, a purple, circular logo with a fleur-de-lis in the center, surrounded by a length of rope tied with a reef knot (also called a square knot). Baden-Powell used a fleur-de-lis badge awarded to British Army scouts and subsequently adopted and modified the badge for Scouting. The arrowhead represents the North point on a compass, and is intended to point Scouts on the path to service and unity. The three points on the fleur-de-lis represent the three parts of the Scout Promise: - service to others, duty to God and obedience to the Scout Law. The two five-point stars stand for truth and knowledge, with the ten points representing the ten points of the Scout Law. The bond at the base of the fleur-de-lis symbolizes the family of Scouting. The encircling rope symbolizes the unity and family of the World Scout Movement.

Recognition of non-national Scouting organizations
The needs of Scout youth in unusual situations has created some interesting permutations, answerable directly to the World Scout Bureau. These permutations fall generally into three categories:
 "National" Movements not operating within the boundaries of their original homelands, such as the Russian and Armenian exile groups;
 Small, non-voting associations basically viewed by the BSIB as "councils", such as the Boy Scouts of the United Nations and the International Boy Scouts of the Canal Zone
 The less well-known directly registered "mixed-nationality Troops".
Both the Boy Scouts of United Nations and the International Boy Scouts of the Canal Zone have long since disbanded, and the only remaining directly registered Troop is the International Boy Scouts, Troop 1 located in Yokohama, Japan.

In addition to these three groups a temporary recognition was extended by the BSIB to Scouts in displaced persons camps after World War II. In 1947 at the 11th International Conference the "Displaced Persons Division" of the BSIB was established to register and support Scouts in displaced person camps in Austria, Northern Italy, and Germany. These Scouts did not receive the right of membership in the Boy Scouts International Conference but gained recognition as Scouts under the protection of the Bureau until they took up residence in a country that had a recognized National Scouting Organization, which they then could join. The D.P. Division was closed on 30 June 1950.

The International Conference of the Boy Scout Movement decided to admit and recognise the exile Russian Scout group as the "Representatives of Russian Scouting in Foreign Countries" on 30 August 1922 and the Armenian Scouts in France were recognized as a "National Movement on Foreign Soil" on 30 April 1929.

The Boy Scouts of the United Nations began in 1945, and for years there was an active Boy Scouts of the United Nations with several troops at Parkway Village in New York City, with but 14 members in 1959.

The International Boy Scouts of the Canal Zone, a group in Panama with Scouts that claimed British and not Panamanian nationality was originally placed under the American Scouting overseas of the BSA but, in 1947, was transferred under the International Bureau. In 1957 the group had over 900 members and existed as a directly registered group until the late 60s.

The third category in the directly registered groups, the "mixed-nationality troops", were registered after discussions concerning such troops took place at the 3rd International Conference of 1924 at which the BSIB was authorized to directly register such groups. It seems that the discussion at the 1924 International Conference was, at least in part, prompted by a letter to Baden-Powell from the Scoutmaster of one such troop in Yokohama, Japan. Janning's troop became the first troop directly registered by the BSIB. Only a few troops were directly registered as soon the practice was discontinued and new "mixed" groups were encouraged to join the National Scout Association of their country of residence. In 1955 only two such groups were still active, a troop in Iraq that disbanded that year, and the first group to be registered, the International Troop 1 in Yokohama. The international troop in Yokohama is the only remaining active troop of the small group of the originally directly registered mixed-nationality troops.

Inter-religious Forum of World Scouting

The Inter-religious Forum of World Scouting serves as a working-group for the religions and beliefs represented in Scouting. There are eight main religious groups represented in the Inter-religious Forum of World Scouting:

 CPGS – Council of Protestants in Guiding and Scouting
 DESMOS – International Link of Orthodox Christian Scouts
 ICCS – International Catholic Conference of Scouting
 IFJS – International Forum of Jewish Scouts
 IUMS – International Union of Muslim Scouts
 WBSB – World Buddhist Scout Brotherhood
 Won-Buddhist Scout Council
 The Church of the Latter Day Saints

Publications
Publications of WOSM include:
 Scouting 'Round the World: a book updated every three years with details on all WOSM member organizations;
 WorldInfo: a monthly circular distributed in electronic format with the help of Scoutnet.

See also
 List of World Organization of the Scout Movement members
 Scouts of the World Award

References

Further reading
 Facts on World Scouting, Boy Scouts International Bureau, Ottawa, Canada, 1961
 Laszlo Nagy, 250 Million Scouts, The World Scout Foundation and Dartnell Publishers, 1985
 Eduard Vallory, "World Scouting: Educating for Global Citizenship", Palgrave Macmillan, New York, 2012

External links
 About: World Scout Committee
 About: World Scout Bureau
 World Scout Shops

 
Youth organizations established in 1922
International Scouting organizations
Organisations based in Geneva
International nongovernmental youth organizations